The Nevis Reformation Party is a Nevis-based political party in Saint Kitts and Nevis. The party currently holds none of the eleven seats in the National Assembly. It is the official opposition party on Nevis, holding two of five seats in the Nevis Island Assembly after losing to the CCM in the 2022 election. Since 2020, the NRP has been led by businesswoman and environmental consultant Janice Daniel-Hodge, the first female to lead a political party in the country and daughter of former Premier of Nevis Simeon Daniel.

History
The party was established on 1 August 1970. They first contested national elections in 1971 when they received 7.7% of the national votes and won a single seat. In the 1975 elections the party's vote share rose to 16.2%, but they lost their single seat. After winning 16.0% of the vote in the 1980 elections they won two seats and became part of the People's Action Movement-led coalition government. In 1984 their vote share fell to 10.1% but they increased their representation to three seats. They were reduced to two seats in 1989. The first leader of the party, Simeon Daniel, retired in 1992. The party won only one seat in 1993. The party has since retained their single seat in elections in 1995, 2000, 2004 and 2010. In 2010 NRP representative Patrice Nisbett joined the federal cabinet as Attorney General of Saint Kitts and Nevis. 

In 2006 the party won the Nevis Island Assembly elections, taking three of the five seats and ending the 14-year rule of the Concerned Citizens' Movement. In the 2011 elections, they remained in power after winning three seats again.

The party have lost the last two elections, with the NRP currently in opposition on the Nevis Island Assembly after winning only one of the five available seats in the December 2017 Nevis Island Assembly election.

Leadership
Until 2020, the party has had four leaders: Simeon Daniel (1970-1992), Joseph Parry (1992-2018), Robelto Hector (2018-2020) and Janice Daniel-Hodge (since 2020).

Election results

National Assembly

References

External links
Official website
Defunct website

Political parties in Saint Kitts and Nevis
Political parties established in 1970
Separatism in Saint Kitts and Nevis
Nevis
Regionalist parties
1970 establishments in Saint Kitts and Nevis
Liberal conservative parties
Monarchist parties
Anti-communist parties